E. B. Erwin was an American politician who served as the Mayor of Salt Lake City from 1936 to 1938.

References

Mayors of Salt Lake City
20th-century American politicians